Charles Percy Snow, Baron Snow,  (15 October 1905 – 1 July 1980) was an English novelist and physical chemist who also served in several important positions in the British Civil Service and briefly in the UK government. He is best known for his series of novels known collectively as Strangers and Brothers, and for The Two Cultures, a 1959 lecture in which he laments the gulf between scientists and "literary intellectuals".

Early life and education
Born in Leicester to William Snow, a church organist and choirmaster, and his wife Ada, Charles Snow was the second of four boys, his brothers being Harold, Eric and Philip Snow, and was educated at Alderman Newton's School.

In 1923, he passed the intermediate British School Certificate, and in 1925 went on to take a University of London external degree in Physics at University College, Leicester. Snow later gained a scholarship to Christ's College, Cambridge, and gained his PhD in physics for research investigating the infrared spectra of simple diatomic molecules .

Career and research
In 1930 he became a Fellow of Christ's College, Cambridge. After a Nature paper on a new method of synthesising Vitamin A turned out to be incorrect, he withdrew from further scientific research. 

Snow served in several senior civil service positions: as technical director of the Ministry of Labour from 1940 to 1944, and as a civil service commissioner from 1945 to 1960. He was appointed a Commander of the Order of the British Empire (CBE) in the 1943 New Year Honours. Snow was among the 2,300 names of prominent persons listed on the Nazis' Special Search List, of those who were to be arrested on the invasion of Great Britain and turned over to the Gestapo.

In 1944, he was appointed director of scientific personnel for the English Electric Company. Later he became physicist-director. In this capacity he was to employ his former student Eric Eastwood.

In the 1957 New Year Honours he was knighted, having the honour conferred by Queen Elizabeth II on 12 February, and was created a life peer, as Baron Snow, of the City of Leicester, on 29 October 1964. As a politician, Snow was parliamentary secretary in the House of Lords to the Minister of Technology from 1964 to 1966 in the Labour government of Harold Wilson.

Snow married the novelist Pamela Hansford Johnson in 1950; they had one son. Friends included the mathematician G. H. Hardy, for whom he would write a biographical foreword in A Mathematician's Apology, the physicist Patrick Blackett, the X-ray crystallographer J. D. Bernal, the cultural historian Jacques Barzun and the polymath George Steiner. At Christ's College he tutored H. S. Hoff – later better known as the novelist William Cooper. The two became friends, worked together in the civil service and wrote versions of each other into their novels: Snow was the model for the college dean, Robert, in Cooper's Scenes from Provincial Life sequence. In 1960, Snow gave the Godkin Lectures at Harvard University, about the clashes between Henry Tizard and F. Lindemann (later Lord Cherwell), both scientific advisors to British governments around the time of the Second World War. The lectures were subsequently published as Science and Government.  For the academic year 1961 to 1962,  Snow and his wife both served as Fellows on the faculty in the Center for Advanced Studies at Wesleyan University.

Literary work

Snow's first novel was a whodunit, Death under Sail (1932). In 1975 he wrote a biography of Anthony Trollope. He is better known as the author of a sequence of novels entitled Strangers and Brothers in which he depicts intellectuals in modern academic and government settings. The best-known of the sequence is The Masters. It deals with the internal politics of a Cambridge college as it prepares to elect a new master. With the appeal of an insider's view, the novel depicts concerns other than the strictly academic that influence decisions of supposedly objective scholars. The Masters and The New Men were jointly awarded the James Tait Black Memorial Prize in 1954. Corridors of Power added a phrase to the language of the day. In 1974, Snow's novel In Their Wisdom was shortlisted for the Booker Prize.

In The Realists, an examination of the work of eight novelists – Stendhal, Honoré de Balzac, Charles Dickens, Fyodor Dostoevsky, Leo Tolstoy, Benito Pérez Galdós, Henry James and Marcel Proust – Snow makes a robust defence of the realistic novel.

The storyline of his novel The Search is referred to in Dorothy L. Sayers's Gaudy Night and is used to help elicit the criminal's motive.

The Two Cultures

On 7 May 1959, Snow delivered a Rede Lecture called The Two Cultures, which provoked "widespread and heated debate". Subsequently, published as The Two Cultures and the Scientific Revolution, the lecture argued that the breakdown of communication between the "two cultures" of modern society – the sciences and the humanities – was a major hindrance to solving the world's problems. In particular, Snow argues that the quality of education in the world is on the decline. He wrote:

A good many times I have been present at gatherings of people who, by the standards of the traditional culture, are thought highly educated and who have with considerable gusto been expressing their incredulity at the illiteracy of scientists. Once or twice I have been provoked and have asked the company how many of them could describe the Second Law of Thermodynamics. The response was cold: it was also negative. Yet I was asking something which is about the scientific equivalent of: 'Have you read a work of Shakespeare's?'

I now believe that if I had asked an even simpler question – such as, What do you mean by mass, or acceleration, which is the scientific equivalent of saying, 'Can you read?' – not more than one in ten of the highly educated would have felt that I was speaking the same language. So the great edifice of modern physics goes up, and the majority of the cleverest people in the western world have about as much insight into it as their Neolithic ancestors would have had.

The satirists Flanders and Swann used the first part of this quotation as the basis for their short monologue and song, "First and Second Law".

As delivered in 1959, Snow's Rede Lectures specifically condemned the British educational system, as having since the Victorian period over-rewarded the humanities (especially Latin and Greek) at the expense of science education. He believed that in practice this deprived British elites (in politics, administration, and industry) of adequate preparation for managing the modern scientific world. By contrast, Snow said, German and American schools sought to prepare their citizens equally in the sciences and humanities, and better scientific teaching enabled those countries' rulers to compete more effectively in a scientific age. Later discussion of The Two Cultures tended to obscure Snow's initial focus on differences between British systems (of both schooling and social class) and those of competing countries.

Publications

Strangers and Brothers series

George Passant (first published as Strangers and Brothers), 1940
The Light and the Dark, 1947
Time of Hope, 1949
The Masters, 1951
The New Men, 1954
Homecomings, 1956
The Conscience of the Rich, 1958
The Affair, 1959
Corridors of Power, 1964
The Sleep of Reason, 1968
Last Things, 1970

Other fiction
Death Under Sail, 1932
New Lives for Old, 1933
The Search, 1934
The Malcontents, 1972
In Their Wisdom, 1974, shortlisted for the Booker Prize
A Coat of Varnish, 1979

Non-fiction
The Two Cultures and the Scientific Revolution, 1959
Science and Government, 1961, First Four Square Edition, 1963
The Two Cultures and a Second Look, 1963
Variety of men, 1967
The State of Siege, 1968
Public Affairs, 1971
Trollope: His Life and Art, 1975
The Realists, 1978
The Physicists, 1981

References

Further reading
 C P Snow and the struggle of Modernity. John de la Mothe. (University of Texas Press, 1992). 
 "Venturing the Real" Geoffrey Heptonstall (Contemporary Review June 2008) (Britannica On-line May 2010)
 C P Snow: A reference guide. Paul Boytinck. (Hall, 1980).
 The scientific papers of C P Snow. J C D Brand. History of Science, Vol 26, No 2, pages 111–127. (1988). 
 C P Snow: The Dynamics of Hope Nicholas Tredell. (Palgrave Macmillan 2012).

1905 births
1980 deaths
20th-century English novelists
Alumni of University of London Worldwide
Alumni of the University of London
Alumni of Christ's College, Cambridge
Alumni of the University of Leicester
Commanders of the Order of the British Empire
Snow, C.P.
James Tait Black Memorial Prize recipients
Labour Party (UK) life peers
People educated at Alderman Newton's School, Leicester
People from Leicester
Rectors of the University of St Andrews
Science and technology in the United Kingdom
Wesleyan University faculty
English male novelists
Knights Bachelor
20th-century English male writers
Life peers created by Elizabeth II